Michael Scott Matthew Varty (born February 10, 1952) is a former American football linebacker in the National Football League for the Washington Redskins and Baltimore Colts.  He played college football at Northwestern University and was drafted in the seventh round of the 1974 NFL Draft.

References

1952 births
Living people
American football linebackers
Washington Redskins players
Baltimore Colts players
Northwestern Wildcats football players
Players of American football from Detroit